Monterrey is one of the most important and wealthiest cities in Mexico. Being the third-largest metropolitan area in Mexico, Monterrey serves as a commercial center of the north of the country. Its huge commercial centers and industries are consequences of its big industrialization after the end of the Second French Intervention War (1861–1867). Before this event happened, Monterrey served as a distribution center of imported goods to the north of the country.

The industrial and economic development of the state came in several phases, starting at the end of the Second French Intervention, followed by the development of the industry in the state, and the boom of industrialization before the Mexican Revolution. These three phases dictated the industrial path of Monterrey, each one of them having its own consequences in this process.

During the year 1867, several important changes initiated in the city of Monterrey starting its industrialization: the falling of the commerce in the city, the development of communications, the development of agriculture, development of new industries, and other several changes. Monterrey changed from a distribution center of imported goods to an industrial state in a period of two decades.

Beginning of Monterrey's economy 
Monterrey's economy started to develop when, in 1820, the Refugio port, in Matamoros, was opened. Following this port, the port of Tampico, in 1823, was opened for the city. Both of these ports were important for the economy of the city, thanks to its geographical situation. Monterrey was the only natural path to the center of the country between the mountain range system Sierra Madre Occidental. Due to this, Monterrey was the center of distribution for the states in the north of Mexico: Coahuila, Zacatecas, Durango, Chihuahua, etc.

American Civil War 
Another important event for the development of the economy in Monterrey was the American Civil War. During the civil war, the ports of United States were blocked, causing the use of the ports of the north part of Mexico for the distribution of cotton to Europe. These ports were controlled by the Monterrey's customs, allowing an important capital flow into the city. Even though this brought positive consequences in Monterrey's economy, after the end of the American Civil War, the traffic from the United States stopped, affecting the city's commerce.

Falling of the commerce 
The early development of the city economy was caused by several abnormal events. For example, constant revolutions in the country, establishment of the free zone in the neighbor state Tamaulipas, and the American Civil War. These abnormal events created a constant development on Monterrey's economy. After these events stopped, an inevitable decrease in the city's economy started. Some researches stated that the city could not get again in the same position that was during the city economy development, because it was caused by the abnormal events mentioned before. Despite of this, there exist other two main reasons why the commerce in Monterrey started to decrease: the creation of the “Constraresguardos” and the development of railways in the country.

One of the reasons was the creation of the mobile force “Contraresguardo”. This was a mobile force that was in charge of traveling along far paths and roads to stop clandestine imports. Smuggling was an important economic activity in many towns of Monterrey bringing capital flow into commerce. The creation of this anti-smuggling force caused the decrease of the activity, affecting the economy of many families and commerce in Monterrey. The anti-smuggling forces raised important amounts of money from the smugglings that were stopped: during the years 1869–1870 several contrabands were stopped with a value of $213,415 pesos, in the next year this value increased by $844,542, and during the years 1874–75 a total of 148 contraband were stopped by these forces.

Another important factor for the decrease in commerce in Monterrey was the development of railways in the country. Before this development, Monterrey served as a distribution center for the north states of the country, thanks to its geographical position. The development of railways allowed the north states of the country to get products from other routes, without the intervention of Monterrey. Also, the railways created contrabands in small scale, as people were allowed to go to the frontier easily and in a cheap way, smuggling products. The small-scale contraband affected all kind of commerce in Monterrey, didn't letting them develop.

Communications development 
An important factor in Monterrey's industrialization was the development of communications throughout the state. The development of railways, telegraphs, telephones and trams started a new chapter in Monterrey's transportation and communication era, leaving behind the mule drivers, drivers, and diligence drivers.

Before this new era, the opening of routes was an important topic for the government. Monterrey had several routes that connected it with other neighbor states like Matamoros, Laredo, Tampico, Piedras Negras, Saltillo, etc. These routes where controlled and managed by the municipalities, who didn't take care of them, leaving them in bad shape. Even though, the traffic between this dirt routes were high. The most common mean of transport to transport products, before the development of railways, was by convoys: groups of wagons pulled by mules. Also, the most common way of transporting people between states before the railway, was by the use of errands.

Railways 
The first railway track was inaugurated in 1881, it connected the cities of Monterrey and Matamoros. Other railways were also created to connect Monterrey to other cities in this new mean of transport: Laredo, Saltillo, Lampazos, Salinas Victoria, Cadereyta, Torreon, San Luis Potosí, Mexico, and also with the United States. These new routes of railway boost the movement of large group of people around the state and country in a cheap and effective way. These new railways also helped to present the city of Monterrey in a national and international context. People from outside the city came, especially from the United States, for vacations or business trips.

Telegraph 
The telegraph was the one of the first communication development in the city, before the railways. The first line of telegraph was built 12 years before the first railway track in the city. The telegraph created a communication line between Monterrey and the center of Mexico. Also, the cities of Matamoros, Saltillo, San Luis Potosí, Ciudad Victoria, Nuevo Laredo, etc. These new lines of telegraph communications followed almost the same lines as the routes of railways.

Trams 
One of the first means of urban transportation was the tram. The first tram was built in 1882 by the government of the state. Later, permissions to build more tram routes around the city were delivered to private companies. By the year of 1891, most of the tram lines were managed by four private companies who had a total of 40 kilometers of tram lines, 58 wagons and 17 loading platforms. All of these track lines connected the urban and rural zones of Monterrey.

Telephone 
In 1882, the telephone was installed in the city of Monterrey. The purpose of the first line of telephones was for the use of the government, connecting the house of General Treviño with the headquarters in the city. The use of telephones for public purposes was established in 1883. By the next year, it already had 91 subscriptions, 256 telephone devices, and 300 kilometers of telephone line.

Agriculture 

Before the industrialization of Monterrey, agriculture and cattle raising were the most important economic activities of the city. Monterrey was an exporting city, exporting to the rest of the country corn and sugar cane. Even though corn was the most agricultural product produced in the city, sugar can was the most profitable. Piloncillo was a very profitable product and it was extracted from the sugar cane. Monterrey was one of the most important cities that exported this product to the country. Also, cattle raising was an important activity for the city, but throughout the years, it was being substituted by the agriculture. This decrease in cattle production was also caused by other factor besides the growing agricultural activity in the city. It was caused also by the cattle theft, attacks of barbarian Indians to the farms, revolutions through the state and droughts. In the year of 1890, the rural activities of the city were in development, having an increase in agricultural and cattle raising production.

Development of new industries in Monterrey 
Before the fall of commerce in Monterrey, huge amount of capital flowed into the city. This gave a lot of economic resources to families and businessmen of the region. After the fall of commerce in the city, this families and businessmen started to look for new industries in which they could invest their resources. The industries that were developed by these investments were in the areas of mining, railways and customs, textiles, and livestock companies. After these investments, the industrialization of Monterrey was initiated.

The textile industry was one of the first industries developed in Monterrey. The first textile companies were called “La Fama”, which was founded in 1854 by an investment group, and “El Porvenir”, founded in 1871. After this two companies were founded, more little textile industries were created in the region, causing that the textile industry was an important activity for the city of Monterrey after several years.

Other new industries that were founded in Monterrey during the same period were little workshops and handcrafts. The main objective of the workshops was to create tools for agricultural purposes, creating wheat mills, floats, and other agricultural tools. Other new industries developed were hat, ice, floats, and cars, sugar and mezcal, beer, pasta, starch, candles production. These small industries became the beginning of the industrialization of Monterrey.

All these new industries that were developed started to change the way of thinking of the government, businesses and people in Monterrey. The idea that the industrialization of the city was the solution for the future of the state was starting to appear. The government and business started to foment the industrialization in all the aspects of the economy. An important tool to expand this idea through the state and to present Monterrey's product to the country and internationally was by the use of expositions. In these expositions, products were presented in four different categories: industry, labor, mechanical arts and arts. All these expositions helped the community to get to know all the products that were produced in Monterrey and the innovations on them. The products of Monterrey reached exposition in the United States like the exposition of New Orleans in 1885, Paris in 1889, and San Antonio in 1889. These expositions were an important platform for the world to get to know Monterrey as an industrial center.

Industrialization of Monterrey 
In 1889, the first important industries for the industrialization were founded: Fabrica de Cerveza y Hielo de Monterrey and Fundicion de Fierro y Elaboracion de Maquinaria Monterrey. The first industry was in beer production and the second was in the melting industry. The foundation of these two industries in Monterrey, caused a wave of concessions for the foundation of new industries in the city. Many industries were founded in the next several years, covering diverse areas of industries: furniture, metal, clothe, cigarettes, soap, among others. In a period of 3 years, 14 new industries were founded in Monterrey.

Causes of industrialization 

This boom in the industrialization of Monterrey was caused by internal and external factors of the city. The internal factors are the ones that involved the citizens and business of Monterrey. On the other hand, the external factors are the ones that involve everything that influenced Monterrey from the outside of its borders. These factors had an important role in the development of the industry in Monterrey.

External factors 
One of the external factors was the high tariffs of the United States government high sales rates on metals. These high rates caused metal industries to be founded in Monterrey, avoiding these high costs. Monterrey had an advantage over other cities that also were affected by these high rates in United States, it was connected with several important mining centers of the country, reducing the cost of transporting the coal needed for the mining industry.

Another important external factor in Monterrey's industrialization was the international investment in the city. Most of the businessmen or companies that invested in new industries in the city were from outside of Mexico. The brought important amounts of capital into the city, leading them into a favorable position to its citizens and government for future development.

Internal factors 

One important factor was the government position towards the foundation of new industries in the city. The government in Monterrey reduced taxes and lent land to business or persons who wanted to create new industries in the city, creating a friendly environment for entrepreneurs. This environment could not be performed without the important amounts of capital that were created during the early stages of commerce in the city. The huge amount of economic resources that some citizens and businesses in Monterrey had available for investments were a key factor on the industrialization. Also, another important factor in this phase, was the huge amount of skilled craftsmen. These craftsmen were important to the industries, who contract them because they knew how to use machines and work in the production of products.

One important factor was Monterrey's geographical position towards United States. Monterrey is the nearest important city of Mexico to the frontier and industrial area of the United States. This closeness also let Monterrey's citizens to go to the United States to study or work in the neighbor country, bringing new ideas and process to the industrial sector of Monterrey.

Industrial expansion 

Monterrey's industrialization continued another 20 years and stopped during the Mexican Revolution. During these 20 years, the industries in the city continued to develop and to grow. The most important and more developed industries during this interval of time were:

 Metal Plants (Nuevo León Smelting and Manufacturing Company Limited, Compañia Minera, Fundidora y Afinadora Monterrey, La Gran Fundacion Nacional Mexicana)
 Cerveceria Cuauhtemoc
 Fundidora de Fierro y Acero
 Glass Industry (Fábrica de Vidrios y Cristales, S.A.)
 Cementos Hidalgo
 Industry for construction materials.
 Textile industry

This industrialization raised again the commerce in the city, creating new commerce and investments in Monterrey, causing an increment in the capital flow to the city and its businesses. The population in Monterrey also increased thanks to its industrialization and commerce attraction, catching the attention of businessmen and families from other states. This industrialization brought more development in Monterrey urbanization, lifestyle and education, beneficiating its citizens, industries and commerce.

References

External links 

 Monterrey
 History of Monterrey

Industrial history
History of Monterrey
Economic history of Mexico